Sebastian Kosiorek (born 28 January 1983) is a Polish rower. He competed at the 2004 Summer Olympics and the 2008 Summer Olympics.

References

1983 births
Living people
Polish male rowers
Olympic rowers of Poland
Rowers at the 2004 Summer Olympics
Rowers at the 2008 Summer Olympics
People from Ełk
Sportspeople from Warmian-Masurian Voivodeship